Tariq Aziz (Punjabi, ; 28 April 1936 – 17 June 2020) was a Pakistani television host, poet and film actor, known for PTV's quiz show Neelam Ghar, first aired in 1974, later renamed the Tariq Aziz Show and lately as Bazm-e-Tariq Aziz. He was known for his iconic line " Dekhti Aankhon,Sunte Kaanon Tariq Aziz ka Salam". 

He was the first face to appear on television in Pakistan. He had also been a member of the National Assembly of Pakistan between 1997 and 1999.

Early life
Tariq Aziz was born in 1936 to Punjabi Arain family, in Jalandhar, Punjab, British India. His father's name was Mian Abdul Aziz. He received his early education in Jalandhar and in 1947 migrated to the then Montgomery city now Sahiwal, Pakistan. He graduated from the Government College Sahiwal.

Career
Aziz moved to Lahore to start his career at Radio Pakistan in 1961. Later when Pakistan Television (PTV) started its initial broadcast in November 1964 from Lahore, Aziz was the first person to be seen on it and went on to become first male PTV announcer.

Television
He was one of the first TV hosts to gain commercial success by using the platform of his quiz show Neelam Ghar/Tariq Aziz Show/Bazm E Tariq Aziz. He interviewed many notable intellectuals, sports persons and celebrities on his shows."Game shows are all the rage on television these days and their highly-paid hosts have their dedicated fans. But what about Tariq Aziz, the pioneer of Pakistani game shows?"
He appeared, as a guest, and answered all the questions on the game show Inam Ghar in Pakistan, becoming the first man to do this. He did this without using any help provided to the participants. He then donated all the prizes that he received to an organisation which works for the welfare of people.

Film
Tariq Aziz, along with the film actor Waheed Murad and film actress Zeba, starred in Pakistani film Insaniyat (1967). Aziz also starred in other Pakistani films "Haar Gaya Insaan" and then later in Qasam us Waqt Ki (1969). Aziz appeared on several local television programs and morning shows. He also organised telethons for charity purposes. Aziz also acted in a number of Pakistani films in the late 1960s and 1970s in side-roles. One of his movies was Salgira (1969) which was a highly successful musical movie and won two Nigar Awards for that year.

Politics 
Aziz was active in student politics during his college era and joined Zulfiqar Ali Bhutto's Pakistan Peoples Party in 1970. At that time, Aziz was called a "Firebrand Socialist" known for charging up the crowds with revolutionary slogans at Bhutto's rallies. However, later he parted ways with that party and went back to showbiz. In 1996, Aziz joined Pakistan Muslim League (N) and was elected as a member of Pakistan National Assembly from Lahore. He was one of the political activists who were charged with attacking the Supreme Court of Pakistan building in 1997.

During Pervez Musharraf's presidency, he joined his political party Pakistan Muslim League (Q). However, he could not attain any status of note in that party and was sidelined. Again, he returned to the entertainment industry. But this time his career in the entertainment industry could not reach the highs of the 1960s, 1970s, and 1980s due to the plenty of competition by newly-launched private TV channels in Pakistan after 2002.

Aziz was a philanthropist, book-lover, and poetry reciter. In 2018, a major English-language Pakistani newspaper reported about him, "He (Tariq Aziz) shared that having children or no children is the will of Allah and since he has no kids of his own, he would like to give all his earnings for the welfare of his country. Aziz has won the hearts of many by announcing his will and he surely is a role model for all of us."

Literary works
Tariq Aziz was a poet of Punjabi language and writer. His books include:
Hamzad Da Dukh (ہمزاد دا دکھ): Poetry in Punjabi language
Iqbal Shanasi (اقبال شناسی): To Know Iqbal
 Hazar Dastaan.( ہزار داستان) His collection of Urdu newspaper Columns.
 Footpath sy Parliament tak . Book written by Tariq Aziz.

Death
He died on 17 June 2020 in Lahore, aged 84. He was admitted to a private hospital on the night of 16 June 2020 after feeling ill. He was laid to rest at the Garden Block, Garden Town graveyard Lahore Pakistan beside his mother’s  grave.

Awards and recognition
Pride of Performance Award by the President of Pakistan in 1992 for his services to the nation.
At 9th PTV Awards he won Best Host Award in 1998

References

External links
 

1936 births
2020 deaths
Pakistani radio presenters
Pakistani game show hosts
Pakistani television hosts
Pakistani television people
Pakistani male film actors
Pakistani actor-politicians
Pakistan Muslim League (N) MNAs
Pakistani MNAs 1997–1999
Punjabi people
People from Jalandhar district
People from Sahiwal
People from Sahiwal District
PTV Award winners
Recipients of the Pride of Performance